The 1968 UC Riverside Highlanders football team represented the University of California, Riverside as an independent during the 1968 NCAA College Division football season. Led by fourth-year head coach Pete Kettela, UC Riverside compiled a record of 4–5. The team outscored its opponents 235 to 182 for the season. The Highlanders played home games at Highlander Stadium in Riverside, California.

This was the last year that Highlanders competed as an independent as they joined the California Collegiate Athletic Association (CCAA) in 1969.

Schedule

References

UC Riverside
UC Riverside Highlanders football seasons
UC Riverside Highlanders football